Moonlight Agony was a Swedish progressive power metal band which formed in 1999 in Kungsbacka, Sweden. They split up in 2009. Before they settled on the name Moonlight Agony they were named Thorin and Moonlight Sonata. They were signed with the label Massacre Records.

Line-up

Band members
Martin Mellström − Synthesizers
Robert Willstedt − Drums
David Akesson − Vocals
Rikard "Peson" Petersson − Guitars
Karl "Kalle" Landin − Guitars
Christer "Zigge" Pedersen − Bass

Former members
Simon Hermansson − Vocals
Jimmy Elmgren − Drums
Andreas Lindvall − Guitars
Christian J Karlsson - Guitars/Vocals
Christofer Starnefalk − Bass
Chitral "Chity" Somapala − Vocals

Discography 
Dust − Demo (2001)
Moonlight Agony − Demo (2001)
Echoes of a Nightmare − Demo (2002)
Echoes of a Nightmare − (2004)
Silent Waters − (2007)

References

External links 
Moonlight Agony official homepage
Moonlight Agony at MySpace
Moonlight Agony at Encyclopaedia Metallum

Swedish progressive metal musical groups
Swedish power metal musical groups
Musical groups established in 1999
1999 establishments in Sweden